Hilan is a village in Zgharta District, in the Northern Governorate of Lebanon.

External links
Ehden Family Tree

Hilan also written Hilane occupy most of the east side of mount terbel . it is 15 km from tripoli , north lebanon . 
the largest families in hilan or hilane are Chamma , Ismail, Halloum, Tleige, Elmir , Rashidi, Hawa , Adouj, Feri.
Hilan people migrated extensively to Sydney , Australia ... some of the migrants are also found in germany, denmark, kuwait , uae , saudi arabia 

....
Hilan Arabic script is حيلان
حيلان: ~ الاقوياء الاشداء || ~ القوي الشديد
Hilan means the solid strong people 
Hilan or hilan can also be found on facebook

Populated places in the North Governorate
Zgharta District